Events from the year 1768 in Wales.

Incumbents
Lord Lieutenant of Anglesey - Sir Nicholas Bayly, 2nd Baronet
Lord Lieutenant of Brecknockshire and Lord Lieutenant of Monmouthshire – Thomas Morgan
Lord Lieutenant of Caernarvonshire - Thomas Wynn
Lord Lieutenant of Cardiganshire – Wilmot Vaughan, 1st Earl of Lisburne
Lord Lieutenant of Carmarthenshire – George Rice
Lord Lieutenant of Denbighshire - Richard Myddelton  
Lord Lieutenant of Flintshire - Sir Roger Mostyn, 5th Baronet 
Lord Lieutenant of Glamorgan – Other Windsor, 4th Earl of Plymouth
Lord Lieutenant of Merionethshire - William Vaughan
Lord Lieutenant of Montgomeryshire – Henry Herbert, 1st Earl of Powis 
Lord Lieutenant of Pembrokeshire – Sir William Owen, 4th Baronet
Lord Lieutenant of Radnorshire – Edward Harley, 4th Earl of Oxford and Earl Mortimer

Bishop of Bangor – John Egerton
Bishop of Llandaff – John Ewer
Bishop of St Asaph – Richard Newcome
Bishop of St Davids – Charles Moss (from 30 November)

Events
2 March - Rowland Pugh, a local miner, discovers the "Great Lode" of copper on Parys Mountain and is rewarded with a bottle of whisky and a rent-free house for his lifetime.
By May - Kymer's Canal opens.
16 May - Evan Lloyd is fined £50 after being found guilty of libel against William Price.
24 August - A seminary is founded at Trefeca-isaf for the training of evangelical preachers, with financial assistance from Selina, Countess of Huntingdon.
10 December - Richard Wilson is a founder member of the Royal Academy of Arts.
Oldest Jews' burial ground in Wales established at Swansea.
The Ladies of Llangollen meet for the first time in Ireland.
Controversial Bishop of Bangor John Egerton is translated to the see of Lichfield in England.

Arts and literature

New books

English language
John Griffith - Some Brief Remarks upon Sundry Important Subjects … principally addressed to the … Quakers …

Welsh language
Thomas Edwards (Twm o'r Nant) - Y Farddoneg Fabilonaidd
William Williams Pantycelyn - Tri Wyr o Sodom

Music
14 May - In Dublin, a concert takes place for the benefit of "Jones", a resident of Britain Street, where music will be performed on "that most admired instrument, the Welsh Harp".

Births
29 March - Sir Robert Vaughan, 2nd Baronet, landowner (died 1843)
17 May (in Brunswick, Germany) - Caroline of Brunswick, future Princess of Wales (died 1821)
5 August - Sydenham Edwards, botanical artist (died 1819)
17 September - Edward Lloyd, 1st Baron Mostyn (died 1854)
date unknown 
John Bird, landscape artist (died 1829)
Thomas Parry, merchant (died 1824)

Deaths
26 March - Humphrey Owen, academic, 65
31 August - Henrietta Nevill, Baroness Bergavenny, 38
date unknown
Robert Morris, industrialist
Hannah Pritchard, actress

References

Wales
Wales